Jabla Sport Club, is an Iraqi football team based in Babil, that plays in the Iraq Division Three.

Managerial history
 Mohammed Sohail Chaychan
 Najem Abdullah 
 Hamed Eissa Muhaimed

See also
 2020–21 Iraq FA Cup
 2021–22 Iraq FA Cup

References

External links
 Jabla SC on Goalzz.com
 Iraq Clubs- Foundation Dates

2019 establishments in Iraq
Association football clubs established in 2019
Football clubs in Babil